The Architect of the Capitol (AOC) is the federal agency responsible for the maintenance, operation, development, and preservation of the United States Capitol Complex. It is an agency of the legislative branch of the federal government and is accountable to the United States Congress and the Supreme Court. Both the agency and the head of the agency are called "Architect of the Capitol". The head of the agency is appointed to a 10-year term by the President of the United States, confirmed by the United States Senate, and is accountable to the President.

Overview
The agency had 2,444 employees and an annual budget of approximately $788 million as of September 2022.

The head of the agency sits on the Capitol Police Board, which has jurisdiction over the United States Capitol Police, and on the United States Capitol Guide Board, which has jurisdiction over the United States Capitol Guide Service.

Until 1989, the architect of the Capitol was appointed by the president of the United States for an indefinite term. Legislation in 1989 provides that the president appoints the architect for a term of ten years, with the advice and consent of the Senate, from a list of three candidates recommended by a congressional commission. On confirmation by the Senate, the architect becomes an official of the legislative branch as an officer and agent of Congress. The architect is eligible for reappointment after completion of the term.

Responsibility

The office is also responsible for the upkeep and improvement of the Capitol Grounds, and the arrangement of inaugural ceremonies and other ceremonies held in the building or on the grounds. Legislation over the years has placed additional buildings and grounds under the Architect of the Capitol.

The Capitol Complex includes:
 the Capitol
 Capitol Visitor Center
 the eight congressional office buildings
 Cannon
 Ford
 Longworth
 O'Neill
 Rayburn
 Russell
 Dirksen
 Hart
 Library of Congress buildings
 United States Supreme Court Building
 United States Botanic Garden
 Thurgood Marshall Federal Judiciary Building
 Capitol Power Plant
 Juno Webster Senate Page Residence
 United States Capitol Police headquarters and K9 division facilities
 other facilities

Architects of the Capitol

See also
 Office of the Supervising Architect for the U.S. Treasury
 Architecture of Washington, D.C.

References

External links

 
 Official blog
 The Architect's Virtual Capitol
 
 Architect of the Capitol: Evolution and Implementation of the Appointment Procedure from the Congressional Research Service

1793 establishments in the United States
Agencies of the United States Congress